Joe Parsons (born January 21, 1988 in Yakima, Washington) is an American snowmobiler who, as of January 2017, has won 17 medals at the Winter X Games.

References

Living people
X Games athletes
Snowmobile racers
1988 births
Sportspeople from Yakima, Washington